The 2024 World Para Athletics Championships is an upcoming Paralympic track and field meet organized by the World Para Athletics subcommittee of the International Paralympic Committee.

It will be the 11th edition of the event and it is scheduled to be held in the Kobe Universiade Memorial Stadium in Kobe, Japan, from 17 to 25 May 2024. This will be the first time the event is held in East Asia.

The event was initially scheduled for September 2021 but it was rescheduled to avoid clashing with the 2020 Summer Paralympics which were rescheduled due to the COVID-19 pandemic.

In January 2022, the organisers requested World Para Athletics for postponement of the event until 2024 due to COVID-19 concerns. A week later, World Para Athletics confirmed that the event would not be held in 2022.

See also 
 2022 World Athletics Championships

References

External links 
 Official website

World Para Athletics Championships
World Para Athletics Championships
World Para Athletics Championships
2024 in Japanese sport
World Para Athletics Championships, 2024